Bustin' Thru (also written as Bustin' Through) is a 1925 American silent Western film directed by Clifford Smith and starring Jack Hoxie, Helen Lynch and William Bailey.

Synopsis
Jack Savage refuses to sell his ranch to millionaire John Merritt who has previously shown no interest in ranching. It becomes clear that he believes that there is gold beneath the property, and his lawyer manages to acquire it through a technicality. However, Jack has fallen in love Merritt's daughter Helen, and after marrying her he reclaims his ranch.

Cast
 Jack Hoxie as Jack Savage
 Helen Lynch as Helen Merritt
 William Bailey as Harvey Gregg 
 Alfred Allen as John Merritt
 George Grandee as Rudolph Romano

References

Bibliography
 Connelly, Robert B. The Silents: Silent Feature Films, 1910-36, Volume 40, Issue 2. December Press, 1998.
 Munden, Kenneth White. The American Film Institute Catalog of Motion Pictures Produced in the United States, Part 1. University of California Press, 1997.

External links
 

1925 films
1925 Western (genre) films
American silent feature films
Silent American Western (genre) films
American black-and-white films
Films directed by Clifford Smith
Universal Pictures films
1920s English-language films
1920s American films